Enver Marina (born 27 January 1977) is a Kosovan-Albanian footballer who plays for FV 07 Diefflen.

Honours
 Oberliga Südwest (V): 2009
 Regionalliga West (IV): 2010

References

External links
 

1977 births
Living people
Sportspeople from Pristina
Kosovan footballers
Association football goalkeepers
SVN Zweibrücken players
1. FC Saarbrücken players
Borussia Neunkirchen players
3. Liga players
Kosovan expatriate footballers
Expatriate footballers in Germany
Kosovan expatriate sportspeople in Germany